Gijs Smal (born 31 August 1997) is a Dutch professional footballer who plays as a left-back for Eredivisie club FC Twente.

Club career
Born in De Rijp, Smal made his Eerste Divisie debut for FC Volendam on 22 September 2017 in a game against De Graafschap. He then managed to establish himself in the starting line-up and made 28 league appearances in his first season. The following season, Smal lost the competition for left-back to Robin Schouten, who had come over from Jong Ajax, and mainly appeared as a substitute. However, he did become champion of the Derde Divisie Sunday with the reserve team, Jong Volendam. Under the new head coach Wim Jonk, he again became a starter for the first team in the 2019–20 season. With six goals and ten assists, he was a key player in the second-tier that season, which was suspended and later abandoned due to the COVID-19 pandemic. 

On 26 June 2020, Smal signed a three-year contract with Eredivisie club FC Twente, coming over on a free transfer.

References

External links
 
 

1997 births
Living people
People from Graft-De Rijp
Sportspeople from Alkmaar
Dutch footballers
Footballers from North Holland
Association football central defenders
Eredivisie players
Eerste Divisie players
Derde Divisie players
AFC '34 players
FC Volendam players
FC Twente players